Génesis del Carmen Franchesco Machado (born ) is a Venezuelan female volleyball player. She was part of the Venezuela women's national volleyball team.

She competed with the national team at the 2008 Summer Olympics in Beijing,  China. She played with Miranda in 2008. She took part of the 2015 Venezuela League championship with Vikingas de Miranda.

Clubs
  Vikingas de Miranda (2008)
  Guerreras de Guarico (2013-2014)
  Vikingas de Miranda (2015)

Awards

Club Championships
 2015 Venezuelan League Championship -  Champion, with Vikingas de Miranda

See also
 Venezuela at the 2008 Summer Olympics

References

External links
 FIVB Profile
 CEV Profile
 http://www.scoresway.com/?sport=volleyball&page=player&id=5113
http://www.gettyimages.ca/photos/genesis-franchesco?excludenudity=true&sort=mostpopular&mediatype=photography&phrase=genesis%20franchesco

1990 births
Living people
Venezuelan women's volleyball players
Place of birth missing (living people)
Volleyball players at the 2008 Summer Olympics
Olympic volleyball players of Venezuela
20th-century Venezuelan women
21st-century Venezuelan women